Lee Henderson (born March 1990) is a hurler. He plays for Seán MacCumhaills and also, formerly, for the Donegal county team.

He plays as a forward.

Henderson made his debut for Donegal at the age of 17.

He came on as a late substitute in the final of the 2011 Lory Meagher Cup as Donegal claimed a first All-Ireland hurling title with victory over Tyrone.

He won the 2013 Nicky Rackard Cup with Donegal, playing in the final against Roscommon and scoring ten points (seven of which were frees).

Henderson played for Donegal during the 2018 National Hurling League, when the county recorded their first competitive victories over Derry and Down. Donegal also defeated Armagh in the closing game of that league campaign. Donegal went on to win the 2018 Nicky Rackard Cup, though Henderson's role in the final was limited to a late substitute appearance due to an ankle injury.

The Donegal News described Henderson in 2020 as "one of Donegal's most consistent performers for the last decade".

Injury forced him to retire from inter-county hurling at the end of the 2021 season.

Henderson coached the Donegal under-20 hurlers in 2022 under the management of Paul Burns.

Honours
Club
2010 Donegal Senior Hurling Championship
2016 Donegal Senior Hurling Championship
2022 Donegal Intermediate Hurling Championship (c.)

County
2011 Lory Meagher Cup
2013 Nicky Rackard Cup
2018 Nicky Rackard Cup

References

External links
 Lee Henderson profile at Bill Hill Wicklow

1990 births
Living people
Donegal inter-county hurlers
Hurling coaches
Hurling forwards
Seán MacCumhaills hurlers